Xinduo (Chinese:新垛) is a township-level division in Xinghua, Jiangsu, China.

See also 
List of township-level divisions of Jiangsu

References 
https://web.archive.org/web/20120307112307/http://www.xhxd.gov.cn/

Township-level divisions of Jiangsu